Khaki-ye Olya (also Romanized as Khākī-ye ‘Olyā; also known as Khākī-ye Bālā) is a village in Kakavand-e Gharbi Rural District, Kakavand District, Delfan County, Lorestan Province, Iran. At the 2006 census, its population was 52, in 8 families.

References 

Towns and villages in Delfan County